was a Japanese writer and artist. One of his self-portraits appears in the Mie Prefectural Art Museum in Tsu Mie Prefecture, Japan (not pictured here).  He trained at the Fine Arts Academy in Tokyo and was influenced by Western art styles.  His work is described as being muscular and robust.

References 

1896 births
1919 deaths
Deaths from Spanish flu
Japanese writers